Efobi v Royal Mail [2021] UKSC 33 is a judgment of the Supreme Court of the United Kingdom.

The case was heard by Lord Hodge, Lord Briggs, Lady Arden, Lord Hamblen, and Lord Leggatt on 27 April 2021. The judgment was delivered on 23 July 2021.

The Supreme Court held that the burden of proof in employment discrimination cases was unaffected by a change to the wording of the Equality Act 2010.

References 

2021 in British law
2021 in case law
Supreme Court of the United Kingdom cases